Double Ascension is an abstract 14-1/2' high x 33' long public sculpture. The individual steps measure: 2'11" x 11' x 9". The sculpture is fabricated in painted steel public art sculpture by Herbert Bayer mounted within a 60-foot diameter pool.  It is located at City National Plaza at 515 South Flower Street, Bunker Hill, Los Angeles, California, United States.

History
The sculpture was dedicated on January 20, 1973. Bayer was commissioned by ARCO, and he based his design on his earlier works "Articulated Wall", "Double Twist", and "Stairs to Nowhere."  An unverified claim is that Bayer's original title for the sculpture was Stairway to Nowhere, which he changed at the request of company officials.

References

1969 establishments in California
1969 sculptures
Abstract sculptures in California
Downtown Los Angeles
Outdoor sculptures in Greater Los Angeles
Steel sculptures in California